Preface may refer to:

Preface, an introduction to a book or other literary work written by the work's author.
Preface (liturgy), portion of the Eucharistic Prayer that immediately precedes the Canon or central portion of the Eucharist

Literature
Preface (collection opening, Volume II), first volume of Evenings on a Farm Near Dikanka by Nikolai Gogol, written in 1832
Prefaces, a book by Søren Kierkegaard published under the pseudonym Nicolaus Notabene

Music 
Preface (band), a French musical band (1985-1988)
Preface, an album by Jessica Harp
The Preface (album), an album by Elzhi
Proem (EP), an album by King 810